Gropparello is a comune (municipality) in the Province of Piacenza in the Italian region Emilia-Romagna, located about  northwest of Bologna and about  south of Piacenza.

The altimetric span is thus .

Gropparello borders the following municipalities: Bettola, Carpaneto Piacentino, Lugagnano Val d'Arda, Morfasso, Ponte dell'Olio, San Giorgio Piacentino.

Sights include the Castle of Montechino.

References

External links
 Official website

Cities and towns in Emilia-Romagna